Periarchiclops is a genus of flies in the family Tachinidae.

Species
Periarchiclops scutellaris (Fallén, 1820)

References

Diptera of Europe
Diptera of Asia
Exoristinae
Tachinidae genera
Taxa named by Joseph Villeneuve de Janti